Dzerzhinsky District is an administrative and municipal district (raion), one of the forty-three in Krasnoyarsk Krai, Russia. It is located in the southeast of the krai and borders with Taseyevsky District in the north, Abansky District in the east, Kansky District in the south, and with Sukhobuzimsky District in the west. Its administrative center is the rural locality (a selo) of Dzerzhinskoye. Population:  17,028 (2002 Census);  The population of Dzerzhinskoye accounts for 50.7% of the district's total population.

Geography
The district is situated in the Kan River basin.

History
The district was founded on December 7, 1934.

Government
The Head of the District and the Chairman of the District Council is Dmitry N. Ashayev.

Economy

Transportation
The Trans-Siberian Railway runs through the district.

References

Notes

Sources

Districts of Krasnoyarsk Krai
States and territories established in 1934